Malekiyeh may refer to:
 Malekiyeh-ye Gharbi
 Malekiyeh-ye Olya
 Malekiyeh-ye Sofla
 Malekiyeh-ye Vosta